Song Shi (born 30 November 1958) is a former Chinese cross-country skier who competed in cross-country skiing at the 1984 Winter Olympics. He finished 66th in the 15 km race, 62nd in the 30 km race, and 15th in the 4 x 10 km relay.

References

1958 births
Living people
Cross-country skiers at the 1984 Winter Olympics
Chinese male cross-country skiers
Olympic cross-country skiers of China
Skiers from Liaoning